AEOM may refer to:

AppleEvent Object Model, a set of protocols built on top of AppleEvents by which applications running under Mac OS could control each other's functions
All Eyez on Me, an album by Tupac Shakur